Ledarius Mack (born October 3, 1996) is an American football outside linebacker who is currently a free agent. Mack went to college at Buffalo and was signed as an undrafted free agent following the 2020 NFL Draft. He is the younger brother of Chargers' linebacker Khalil Mack.

Early life and education
Mack was born on October 3, 1996, in Vero Beach, Florida. He went to Lincoln Park High School. Mack went to college at Buffalo. He was redshirted his first season at Buffalo. He appeared in 14 games in 2018, and had 16 tackles with 2 sacks. In 2019, he played in 13 games, making 1 start, and had 8 sacks.

Professional career

Mack signed with the Chicago Bears as an undrafted free agent following the 2020 NFL Draft. He was released at roster cuts but later signed to the practice squad. He did not make any appearances in his rookie season.

Mack was waived/injured by the Bears on August 17, 2021 and placed on injured reserve. He was subsequently released with an injury settlement. He was re-signed by the Bears on October 13, to the practice squad. Mack was promoted to the active roster for the first time in his career on November 20. He made his NFL debut the following day against the Baltimore Ravens and recorded a tackle in the contest. He was promoted to the active roster again on December 18. He was waived on December 21 and re-signed to the practice squad. He signed a reserve/future contract with the Bears on January 11, 2022. He was waived on May 9.

References

Living people
1996 births
Buffalo Bulls football players
Chicago Bears players
American football outside linebackers
Players of American football from Florida
People from Vero Beach, Florida